Dinh is a Vietnamese surname. In Vietnam, the surname is spelled Đinh or Đình but Đình is very rare in Vietnamese.

Notable people 
 Andy Dinh, Team SoloMid owner, player
 Dan Dinh, League of Legends  player, brother of Andy Dinh
 Đinh Xuân Lưu, Vietnamese Ambassador to Poland and Israel
 Viet D. Dinh (born 1968), lawyer, former US Assistant Attorney General, and chief architect of the Patriot Act

See also
 Ding (surname)

See also
Đinh dynasty

Vietnamese-language surnames